Procidentia is a severe prolapse, the falling down of  an organ from its normal anatomical position, usually referring to uterine prolapse.

See also
 Uterine prolapse (and Female genital prolapse)
 Rectal prolapse
 Prolapse

References

Medical terminology
Gynaecologic disorders